The 14th Pan American Games were held in Santo Domingo, Dominican Republic from August 1 to August 17, 2003.

Medals

Silver

Men's Sunfish Class: Malcolm Smith

Results by events

Athletics

Track

Brian Wellman
Xavier James
Tamika Williams

Bowling
Antoine Jones
Steven Riley
June Dill
Dianne Ingham

Cycling

Road
Kris Hedges
 Men's Road Time Trial — + 2.26 (→ 7th place)
Geri Mewett
 Men's Road Time Trial — + 8.49 (→ 18th place)
Julia Hawley
 Women's Road Time Trial — + 4.54 (→ 15th place)

Diving
Katura Horton-Perinchief

Sailing
Malcolm Smith
Alexander Kirkland

Swimming

Men's Competition

Kiera Aitken

See also
 Bermuda at the 2004 Summer Olympics

References

Bermuda Olympic Committee

Nations at the 2003 Pan American Games
P
2003